95.3 Love Radio (DWKS 95.3 MHz) is an FM station in the Philippines owned and operated by Manila Broadcasting Company. Its studios and transmitter are located at 3rd Floor, Lacson Bldg. Governor Panotes, Ave., Daet, Camarines Norte.

References

External links
Love Radio Daet FB Page
Love Radio Daet Website

Radio stations in Camarines Norte
Radio stations established in 1997